Jürgen Kalb (born 20 May 1948) is a German footballer. He competed in the men's tournament at the 1972 Summer Olympics.

References

External links
 

1948 births
Living people
German footballers
Olympic footballers of West Germany
West German footballers
Footballers at the 1972 Summer Olympics
Footballers from Frankfurt
Eintracht Frankfurt players
Karlsruher SC players
SV Darmstadt 98 players
FC Hanau 93 players
Association football midfielders